Camila is a Mexican telenovela produced by Angelli Nesma Medina for Televisa in 1998. The story is a remake of 1978 Mexican telenovela Viviana. It aired on Canal de Las Estrellas from September 14, 1998 to January 15, 1999.

Bibi Gaytán and Eduardo Capetillo starred as protagonists, while Adamari López, Kuno Becker, Lourdes Reyes and Mariagna Prats starred as the main antagonists.  Gabriela Goldsmith, Víctor Noriega and Enrique Lizalde starred as the Stellar performances.

Plot
Camila Flores (Gaytán) lives with her grandfather in a small village. She meets Mexico City attorney, Miguel Gutierrez (Capetillo), and they quickly fall in love and are married in a civil ceremony. Their church wedding is planned to be a few weeks later, but it never takes place.

Miguel abandons his new wife to marry Mónica Iturralde (López), the spoiled daughter of powerful lawyer Don Armando Iturralde (Lizalde). Racked by guilt in a loveless (and bigamous) marriage, Miguel is torn between his love for Camila and his fear of returning to the poverty that he has spent so much energy escaping.

Meanwhile, Camila finds out she is pregnant and resolves to raise her child by herself and to never forgive her husband. Mónica rapidly becomes disillusioned with her marriage, and she falls in love with Julio (Kuno Becker), the son of the owners of a local beauty salon and gym.

The gym is one of the main locations where the action takes place, as Camila is employed there before her pregnancy becomes noticeable. Ada (Dinorah Cavazos) is soon a good friend of Camila's, while Selene (Lourdes Reyes) sees Camila as a rival for Julio's affection.

Rodrigo (Xavier Ortiz) has his advances rejected by Camila and helps Selene frame her for a theft. The Iturralde Law Firm is also central to the action, as is Don Armando's home, where his wife Ana María (Gabriela Goldsmith) fights a long-term illness.

Cast
 
Bibi Gaytán as Camila Flores
Eduardo Capetillo as Miguel Gutiérrez
Adamari López as Mónica Iturralde
Enrique Lizalde as Armando Iturralde
Gabriela Goldsmith as Ana María de Iturralde
Kuno Becker as Julio Galindo
Patricia Martínez as Rosario "Chayo" Juárez
Lourdes Reyes as Selene Olivares
Abraham Ramos as Pablo Juárez
Yuvia Charlin as Beatriz Molina
Arlette Pacheco as Iris Molina
Julio Mannino as Nacho Juárez
Rebeca Mankita as Natalia Galindo
Daniel Gaurvy as Hernán Galindo
Margarita Magaña as Laura Escobar
Raúl Magaña as Iván Almeida
Raquel Pankowsky as Gloria
Mariagna Prats as Teresa Zúñiga
Maleni Morales as Mercedes Escobar
Víctor Noriega as Dr. Robin Wicks
Vanessa Guzmán as Fabiola
Gerardo Murguía as Andrade
Polly as Julieta
Francesca Guillén as Cecilia
Diana Golden as Silvia Escalante
Enrique Becker as Artemio
Hector Cruz as Fausto
Ignacio López Tarso as Don Genaro
Martha Navarro as Digna
Evelyn Solares as Adela
Sussan Taunton as Renata
Mike Salas as Mike
Giovan D'Angelo as Lorenzo Alarcón
Dinorah Cavazos as Ada Obrera
José Luis Montemayor as Rafael Buendía
Ricardo Carrión as Lucio
Xavier Ortiz as Rodrigo Sandoval
Rafael Inclán as Luis Lavalle
Lisette Morelos as Ingrid Valverde
Ismael Larrumbe as Agent Robledo
Myrrah Saavedra as Mrs. Urquidi
Gustavo Negrete as Doctor
Luis Uribe as Nicandro
Indra Zuno as Elisa
Humberto Elizondo as Lic. Darío Suárez
Manuel Guizar as Dr. Fuentes

References

External links

1998 telenovelas
Mexican telenovelas
1998 Mexican television series debuts
1999 Mexican television series endings
Spanish-language telenovelas
Television shows set in Mexico
Televisa telenovelas